Los Huisaches is a census-designated place (CDP) in Webb County, Texas, United States. This was a new CDP for the 2010 census with a population of 17.

It is one of several colonias in the county.

Geography
Los Huisaches is located at  (27.907028, -99.475803).

Education
Residents are in the United Independent School District. Zoned schools include: San Isidro Elementary School, Elias Herrera Middle School, United High School.

The designated community college for Webb County is Laredo Community College.

References

Census-designated places in Webb County, Texas
Census-designated places in Texas